Dragon NaturallySpeaking (also known as Dragon for PC, or DNS) is a speech recognition software package developed by Dragon Systems of Newton, Massachusetts, which was acquired in turn by Lernout & Hauspie Speech Products, Nuance Communications, and Microsoft. It runs on Windows personal computers. Version 15 (Professional Individual and Legal Individual), which supports 32-bit and 64-bit editions of Windows 7, 8 and 10, was released in August 2016.

Features
Dragon NaturallySpeaking uses a minimal user interface.  As an example, dictated words appear in a floating tooltip as they are spoken (though there is an option to suppress this display to increase speed), and when the speaker pauses, the program transcribes the words into the active window at the location of the cursor. (Dragon does not support dictating to background windows.) The software has three primary areas of functionality: voice recognition in dictation with speech transcribed as written text, recognition of spoken commands, and text-to-speech: speaking text content of a document. Voice profiles can be accessed by different computers in a networked environment, although the audio hardware and configuration must be identical to those of the machine generating the configuration. The Professional version allows creation of custom commands to control programs or functions not built into NaturallySpeaking.

History

Dr. James Baker laid out the description of a speech understanding system called DRAGON in 1975. 
In 1982 he and Dr. Janet M. Baker, his wife, founded Dragon Systems to release products centered around their voice recognition prototype. He was President of the company and she was CEO.

DragonDictate was first released for DOS, and utilized hidden Markov models, a probabilistic method for temporal pattern recognition. At the time, the hardware was not powerful enough to address the problem of word segmentation, and DragonDictate was unable to determine the boundaries of words during continuous speech input. Users were forced to enunciate one word at a time, clearly separated by a small pause after each word. DragonDictate was based on a trigram model, and is known as a discrete utterance speech recognition engine.

Dragon Systems released NaturallySpeaking 1.0 as their first continuous dictation product in 1997.

Joel Gould was the director of emerging technologies at Dragon Systems. Gould was the principal architect and lead engineer for the development of Dragon NaturallyOrganized (1.0), Dragon NaturallySpeaking Mobile Organizer (3.52), Dragon NaturallySpeaking (1.0 through 2.02), and DragonDictate for Windows (1.0). Gould also designed the tutorials in both DragonDictate for DOS version 2.0 and Dragon Talk.

The company was then purchased in June 2000 by Lernout & Hauspie, a Belgium-based corporation that was subsequently found to have been perpetrating financial fraud. Following the all-share deal advised by Goldman Sachs, Lernout & Hauspie declared bankruptcy in November 2000. The deal was not originally supposed to be all stock and the unavailability of the Goldman Sachs team to advise concerning the change in terms was one of the grounds of the Bakers' subsequent lawsuit. The Bakers had received stock worth hundreds of millions of US dollars, but were only able to sell a few million dollars' worth before the stock lost all its value as a result of the accounting fraud. The Bakers sued Goldman Sachs for negligence, intentional misrepresentation and breach of fiduciary duty, which in January 2013 led to a 23-day trial in Boston. The jury cleared Goldman Sachs of all charges. Following the bankruptcy of Lernout & Hauspie, the rights to the Dragon product line were acquired by ScanSoft of Burlington, Massachusetts, also a Goldman Sachs client. In 2005 ScanSoft launched a de facto acquisition of Nuance Communications, and rebranded itself as Nuance.

As of 2012, LG Smart TVs included voice recognition feature powered by the same speech engine as Dragon NaturallySpeaking. In 2014, following the discontinuation of DragonDictate for Mac, a product dating back to Nuance's 2010 purchase of MacSpeech Dictate, NaturallySpeaking gained Mac compatibility, though Mac support was later terminated in 2018.

In 2021, Microsoft announced plans to acquire Nuance, and therefore Dragon NaturallySpeaking. The acquisition completed in March 2022.

Versions

Dragon NaturallySpeaking 12 is available in the following languages; UK English, US English, French, German, Italian, Spanish, Dutch, and Japanese (aka "Dragon Speech 11" in Japan).

See also
 List of speech recognition software

Notes

References

External links
 for Nuance Communications

Nuance software
Windows multimedia software
Windows text-related software
Assistive technology
Proprietary software
Speech recognition software